Hodge Hill Girls' School is a secondary school located in the Hodge Hill area of Birmingham, in the West Midlands of England.

Formerly a grammar school, today it is a non-selective community school administered by Birmingham City Council. Hodge Hill Girls' School offers GCSEs and ASDAN awards as programmes of study for pupils.

References

External links

Secondary schools in Birmingham, West Midlands
Girls' schools in the West Midlands (county)
Community schools in Birmingham, West Midlands